National Movement may mean:

 Movimiento Nacional, the Francoist political structure in Spain
 National Movement (Georgia), a center-right opposition party in the country of Georgia
 National Movement (Luxembourg), a defunct neo-fascist political party in Luxembourg
 National Movement (Poland), a Polish far-right wing party
National Movement of Hope, a minor political party in Algeria
People's National Movement, a liberal political party in Trinidad and Tobago
 Tobago Council of the People's National Movement, the Tobagonian branch of the party
Progressive National Movement, a progressive political party in Colombia
National Movement of Afghanistan, a political party in Afghanistan
Basej-e Milli (National Movement), a political party in Afghanistan
United National Movement (Georgia), a political party in Georgia
United National Movement (Pakistan) (Muttahida Qaumi Movement), a political party in Pakistan
United National Movement (Saint Kitts-Nevis-Anguilla), a political party in St Kitts and Nevis
National Movement (Colombia), a conservative political party in Colombia
Baloch National Movement, a Baloch nationalist political organization
IMRO – Bulgarian National Movement
National Movement for Stability and Progress
Herut – The National Movement, an Israeli political party
 National Movement of the Jewish people, a Jewish movement also known as Zionism
National Movement for the Development of Society
National Movement for the Salvation of the Fatherland, a nationalist political party in Bulgaria
Turkish National Movement, encompassing the political and military activities of the Turkish revolutionaries
National Movement for Reconciliation, a political party in Colombia
Union for the Republic – National Movement, a political party of the Democratic Republic of Congo
National Movement for Nature and Development, a minor Green political party in Algeria.
National Socialist Movement (disambiguation), a name used by a number of neo-Nazi organizations
Mouvement National Congolais, a political party in the Democratic Republic of the Congo
National Movement for the Liberation of Kosovo, a radical left-wing nationalist political movement
National Social Movement (Bulgaria)
National Movement for Sovereignty, a political party in Italy